B76 or B-76 may refer to:
 Bundesstraße 76, a road in Germany
 Radl Pass, a road in Austria
 Sicilian Defense, Dragon Variation, according to the Encyclopaedia of Chess Openings
 A postcode district in the United Kingdom covering the western part of Sutton Coldfield, and encompassing the villages of Curdworth, Lea Marston, Minworth, Walmley, and Wishaw
 HLA-B76, an HLA-B serotype
 Benelli B76, a pistol manufactured in Italy by Benelli